Watashi Wa is a Christian pop rock band from San Luis Obispo, California on Tooth & Nail Records.  in Japanese means "I am".

The band formed in 2000 when most of the members were still in their teens. They were first signed to indie label Bettie Rocket and released two albums before signing to Tooth & Nail in 2002. 

The band broke up in July 2004, but in a deal with Tooth & Nail Records singer/guitarist Seth Roberts' new band Eager Seas, were signed to the same label and released their first album under the name Watashi Wa. They subsequently left the label.

The new band currently plays under the name "Lakes" and have signed with The Militia Group and released the Photographs EP.

Seth Roberts once again is releasing music under the Watashi Wa moniker with an album called People Like People which was written in 2020. People Like People is produced by Seth Roberts and co-produced by Tyler Tedeschi.

Members
Seth Roberts - vocals, guitar
Jeremy Wells - bass
Miles Castenholz - guitar
Teddy Ramirez - drums
Roger Tompkins -  guitar
Tyler Tedeschi - guitar

Both Roger Tompkins and Lane Biermann played their respective instruments in the alt country band Briertone, but have since moved on to pursue other things.

Former members
Mike Newsom - guitar, background vocals
Luke Page - guitar, background vocals
Xavier Alexander - guitar (appears in "All of Me" music video)
Cory Radosevich - bass, background vocals
Erik Brunner - bass
Richard Ruiz - bass
Jonthan Russo - drums
Danny Igarta - bass
Brendon Alvord- guitar
Kevin Alvord-bass
Luke Page - guitar, background vocals
Roger Tompkins - bass
Lane Biermann - drums, background vocals

Discography
People Like People (2022, Tooth & Nail)
Eager Seas (2006, Tooth & Nail)
The Love of Life (2003, Tooth & Nail)
The Color of Today EP (2003, Tooth & Nail)
What's in the Way (2001, Bettie Rocket)
Lost a Few Battles... Won the War (2000, Bettie Rocket)
Stephen's First Day Out (1998, Harvey Records)

Other songs
 "Wonderful" (Released at PureVolume.com in 2004)
 "Message in a Bottle" (The Police cover, released on ¡Policia!: A Tribute to the Police in 2005)
 "Stories" (from 'Punk Never Dies' compilation, released in 2011)

References

External links
Watashi Wa Myspace Page
Watashi Wa PureVolume Page
Official Eager Seas Site
Lakes Myspace Page
Eager Seas PureVolume Page (currently not working)
Watashi Wa Lyrics

American pop rock music groups
Christian rock groups from California
Musical groups established in 2000
Musical groups disestablished in 2004
Tooth & Nail Records artists